Dietrich v The Queen is a 1992 High Court of Australia constitutional case which established a de facto requirement that legal aid be provided to defendants in serious criminal trials. The Court determined an adjournment ought to be granted in such trials where the accused is without legal representation through no fault of their own and proceeding would result in the trial being unfair. The case is said to have "had a fundamental impact on the Australian justice system".

Until Dietrich v The Queen, it was customary for those unable to afford legal representation to be forced to trial, even when facing serious criminal charges, with previous High Court rulings finding representation preferable but not requisite for a fair trial. In a 5–2 opinion, the Court confirmed those facing trial are not entitled to legal aid at public expense, but that courts possess power to order a stay where proceeding would result in an unfair trial.

The case originated in the County Court of Victoria, where Olaf Dietrich, later known as Hugo Rich, had been convicted of importing a trafficable quantity of heroin. Prior to trial, Dietrich had applied for legal assistance through several avenues, all of which were rejected. After leave to appeal was rejected by the Victorian Court of Criminal Appeal, the matter was escalated to the High Court of Australia. Counsel for Dietrich applied for appeal on one ground being Dietrich's lack of legal representation meant the trial in the County Court of Victoria was miscarried.

Background

Legal 

In 1979, the High Court of Australia issued a key ruling clarifying whether a conviction ought to be set aside on the grounds of miscarriage of justice due to not being legally represented. In McInnis v The Queen, the accused faced several serious criminal charges including rape. Unable to afford his own legal representation, McInnis applied for legal aid which did not ultimately succeed. He was then refused an adjournment by the Supreme Court of Victoria, ultimately convicted, and sentenced to a term of imprisonment. The Court of Criminal Appeal dismissed an appeal, and so he applied to the High Court of Australia for special leave to appeal "on the ground that the trial judge erred in refusing his application to adjourn the trial to enable him to obtain the services of counsel and that the refusal so seriously prejudiced him in his trial that it constituted a miscarriage of justice".

In a 4–1 decision, the Court decided it was preferable for defendants of serious criminal charges to be represented, but it was not a legal right and hence the original trial had not involved a miscarriage of justice. As noted by legal scholar Sam Garkawe, proponents of human rights and civil liberties were critical of the decision, which was used as an example of a lack of legal rights in Australian common law to support an argument for the introduction of an Australian Bill of Rights. The criminal justice system is argued by Garkawe to be the "most conspicuous area of the law in terms of the power of the state to restrict the liberty of its citizens", noting human rights lawyers saw Dietrich v The Queen as an opportunity for McInnis v The Queen to be overturned and set a precedent for the right to representation.

Case 

Born in a German refugee camp in 1952, Dietrich came to Australia at age nine. He left school as a teenager to work in retail, marrying at age 18 to a woman with whom he had a daughter. By the time the High Court appeal was decided, Dietrich had already served his sentence, having been released from prison on parole in July 1990 when he changed his name to Hugo Rich.

Having conspired to import narcotics from Thailand to Australia with friend Gregory Middap, Dietrich flew from Bangkok, Thailand to Melbourne, Australia on 17 December 1986 with heroin internally concealed. Middap had informed the Australian Federal Police that Dietrich was carrying drugs, however the police did not find them given the internal concealment. After recovering most of the importation, Middap again informed on Dietrich, who was arrested and taken to Pentridge Prison hospital where the remaining heroin was passed.

Dietrich was charged and tried in the County Court of Victoria for the importation. He sought legal representation from the Victorian Legal Aid Commission, which was refused. A review of the refusal was refused by the Commission, as were applications for legal assistance to the Supreme Court of Victoria and the Attorney-General. Dietrich was hence unrepresented at trial.

The trial before Judge Nixon in the County Court lasted approximately 40 days, from presentment of Dietrich on 23 May 1988 to the return of the jury on 29 July 1988. The indictment on which Dietrich was presented contained three further counts. Two counts alleged possession of the heroin subject to the charge of importation, however these were not considered once a verdict of guilty was reached. A third and final found alleged possession of heroin not subject to the importation charges, and Dietrich was found not guilty on this count. Dietrich pled not guilty to all counts, but was found guilty by a jury of one count of importing a trafficable amount of heroin into Australia, in contravention of section 233 of the Customs Act 1901 (Cth).

Following the conviction, Dietrich was sentenced to a term of seven years imprisonment. He then brought an appeal to the Court of Criminal Appeal, where one ground of application for leave to appeal against his conviction was that every indigent charged with an indictable offence is entitled to legal representation provided at the expense of the state, and that failure for a court to provide such counsel means a subsequent conviction constitutes miscarriage of justice. The Court refused to hear the appeal.

Appeal to the High Court 
Special leave to appeal to the High Court was made by Dietrich on the grounds the Court of Appeal erred in law by holding Dietrich did not have a right to be provided with counsel at public expense, and/or by not granting adjournment his lack of representation meant a miscarriage of justice had occurred, first by finding Dietrich did not have a right for publicly funded representation, and second by failing to find that a miscarriage of justice had occurred due to this lack of representation.

Right to representation 

Dietrich asserted a right to counsel on three sources of law.

First, the appeal cited section 397 of the Crimes Act 1958 which though now repealed, at the time provided "every accused person shall be admitted after the close of the case for the prosecution to make full answer and defence thereto by legal counsel".

Second, the appeal referred to Australia's international obligations, specifically Article 14(3) of the International Covenant on Civil and Political Rights (ICCPR) which provides a person must have the right to legal assistance without payment in a case where the interests of justice so require and one does not have the means to pay. Counsel for Dietrich accepted the ICCPR did not form part of domestic law, but argued the common law ought be developed to enforce rights provided for in "international instruments to which Australia is a party".

Third, counsel for Dietrich suggested analogous cases providing a right to counsel in the common law countries of the United States and Canada. The Sixth Amendment was interpreted by the US Supreme Court in Powell v. Alabama (1932) to hold courts must provide counsel to defendants in capital cases where capital punishment was a possible sentence for an accused unable to afford their own representation. Johnson v. Zerbst (1938) would later expand that principle to cover federal trials. The Supreme Court in Gideon v. Wainwright (1963) then held under the Fourteenth Amendment, that the principle also applied to state courts.

Miscarriage of justice 

Secondary to an argument for right to counsel was the assertion the originating judge should have adjourned the matter until Dietrich was able to provide counsel, and the failure to do so caused a miscarriage of justice. Fairall noted the originating judge's comments regarding the desirability of a prompt trial.

High Court judgment 

The Court majority found an accused has the right to a fair trial, and that courts possess power to adjourn a matter where necessary to ensure this right is met. Past cases show trial of an unrepresented person accused of a serious offence will result in an unfair trial.

Regarding the arguments made by Dietrich on his right to representation, the Court on the first ground considered the decision of Ibrahim v The Queen, where it had too been submitted that section 397 provides for a right to appointed representation. The Court also considered cases decided in Canadian courts, specifically R v Johnson, Re Ewing and Kearney and the Queen, and Barrette v R which had considered a statutory provision similarly worded to that of section 397. The Court found this section meant a person is entitled to be represented in that a Court cannot actively deny representation, but rejected the right to have such representation provided by the state.

In rejecting the second submission, the Court noted such an approach is useful in interpreting legislation to resolve ambiguity, to apply it in this circumstance would be to "declare a right which has hitherto never been recognised should now be taken to exist".

On the third ground, the Court accepted the cases cited by the defence team demonstrated United States law precluded an accused from imprisonment without access to publicly funded representation. The Court also found such analogous cases did not support such an argument in Australia, as these cases were decided based on the United States Constitution which not in the Court's jurisdiction. In Canada, Section Ten of the Canadian Charter of Rights and Freedoms guarantees the right "to retain and instruct counsel without delay and to be informed of that right". The Court examined two applicable cases presented by Dietrich, finding they did not support an argument the Charter entrenched a general right to "counsel at public expense irrespective of the circumstances of the particular case". The Court noted the differences in constitutional law between Australia and the United States and Canada, but concluded Courts would not uphold foreign rights into Australian law without a constitutional basis.

On the secondary argument regarding miscarriage of justice, the Court acknowledged the originating judge reiterated their inability to provide Dietrich with representation, yet seemed unaware of their authority to adjourn the trial, noting they had "overlooked the possibility of adjourning the matter" and "erred in this respect". This error was found to result in an unfair trial, depriving Dietrich of a real chance of acquittal on all charges, given he was found guilty of only one count.

Majority 
In a five to two decision, Chief Justice Mason and Justices Deane, Toohey, Gaudron, and McHugh held:

 where an accused faces serious charges, is indigent, and through no fault of their own not able to obtain representation, any application for adjournment or stay should be granted (unless there are exceptional circumstances) and the trial delayed until such representation can be obtained
 if in such circumstances the seeking of adjournment or stay is denied, resulting in an unfair trial, the conviction must be overturned.

Toohey noted the disadvantages faced by an unrepresented accused, such as having insufficient legal skills and the inability to present their case to the same level as the prosecution. Mason and McHugh represented the majority of the Court in concluding the desirability of an accused charged with a serious offence being represented was so high that trials should proceed without representation only in exceptional circumstances. Gaudron agreed, referring to the fact judges have powers to prevent unfair trials. As a result of the majority decision, the court ordered the application to appeal to be granted, the conviction be quashed and Dietrich to be granted a new trial. The majority dismissed the argument there was a right to counsel at public expense, but that the right of an accused to receive a fair trial is a fundamental element of Australian criminal law. In passing, Deane and Gaudron went as far as to suggest the right to representation was in some circumstances constitutionally guaranteed by Chapter III, which requires judicial process and fairness to be observed. The two also held there was a connection between due process and a right to a fair trial, though made no comment as to the nature of such a connection, and for this reason it can be inferred the justices regard it the power and obligation of courts to prevent an unfair trial as a fundamental aspect of judicial power.

Dissenting 
Justices Brennan and Dawson dissented. Dawson in his dissent acknowledged the idea of "perfect justice", that moving toward it would require anyone accused of an offence to be represented. Graeme Durie, then the Assistant Director of General Law and Policy at of the Legal Aid Commission, pointed out the recognition by Dawson the interests of justice could not be pursued in an isolated case; that competing demands on public money and the limited budget for legal aid was not for courts to address. Dawson noted the role of courts was to ensure as fair a trial as possible, but a fair trial did not and could not include publicly funded representation. He also concluded no miscarriage of justice arises due to an accused lacking legal representation, and that while challenges existed for those without representation, courts were not an appropriate means for allocating public money to provide legal aid. Brennan found no miscarriage of justice occurred merely because an accused had no legal representation, observing while without publicly funded representation criminal justice may not be even-handed, it was for the government and not the courts to allocate such resources.

Consequences

Dietrich's later life

In 1995, Dietrich was convicted of three armed robberies and sentenced to 13 years. Kastenberger was shot by Dietrich for reasons that Justice Lasry who presided over the case said were unclear, noting Dietrich's "appalling history" of more than 80 criminal convictions. Justice Lasry stated they considered Dietrich irredeemable without any prospect of rehabilitation. He was found guilty of the murder of Kastenberger in the Supreme Court of Victoria on 12 June 2009, and he was jailed for life with a non-parole period of 30 years. In 2014 the Court of Appeal dismissed his appeal.

Implications for provision of legal aid 
Dietrich v The Queen does not necessarily mean that the state must provide defence counsel, but it does suggest that in cases where the accused cannot afford counsel and the crime is grave, a judge may be required to suspend the case until counsel is appointed in order to ensure a fair trial. The practical result is that courts can exert pressure on the government to provide the accused with legal representation.

The decision was at the time predicted to have significant impact on future trials and how legal aid was provided. With the decision markedly different from past cases, debate ensued about who ought to receive legal aid and whether those charged with serious offences could avoid conviction where legal aid was not provided. An Australian Senate committee inquiry received multiple submissions highlighting that the decision could result in legal aid funds being redirected from civil or family law matters to criminal cases. This means Dietrich v The Queen restrains the way in which governments could provide assistance – promoting those accused of serious crimes as having a de facto right to public funding, while those facing less serious matters are forgotten. It was argued a better approach would be to limit court intervention to the most serious cases, with courts assessing the circumstance of each applicant.

By the late 1990s, the right to legal representation for indigent people facing serious criminal charges was said to be under threat. Provision of legal aid was hampered by budgetary decisions by the Howard Government, which cut the budget for legal aid by $70 million, leading to judges adjourning serious trials. The Attorney-General had asked courts to be "realistic" about applying principles from Dietrich v the Queen, leading to criticism the government was interfering with the independence of the judiciary.

Dietrich test 
In order for an accused person to succeed in applying for a stay based on the Dietrich v The Queen judgment, the applicant bears the onus of proving on balance they are indigent, charged with a serious offence, and through no fault of their own unable to obtain legal representation. The Court never defined the meaning of "indigent", or establish the scope of terms "serious offence" and "through no fault" of their own. Courts faced problems when applying the Dietrich test as a result.

In the years subsequent to Dietrich v The Queen, a number of questions were raised regarding the meaning of indigence, with few resolved. Shortly after the decision was made, counsel for Dietrich pointed out several aspects of the ruling would need to be "worked out in practice", specifically indigence. Deanne opined a person not liquidating personal assets to pay for representation will have no complaint at law if they are then not provided representation at no cost.  This left open the question of how future judges will assess who is not able to pay for their own representation. As Fairall notes, this may mean anyone with assets of only a home must sell this in order to be considered indigent and hence eligible for publicly funded representation.

The determinant for "serious offence" was suggested to be where there is no threat of a custodial sentence. However, Kift points out if the test is threat of imprisonment without regard to the length of imprisonment, the range of offences to be considered as meeting the Dietrich test is far unclear.

A lack of representation may not make a trial unfair if an accused elects not to have their own legal representation or refuses legal advice.

Contemporary application 
Dietrich v The Queen has been considered and upheld in contemporary trials. Former Melbourne underworld figure Carl Williams argued at his trial for murder an adjournment was required as his preferred representation was unavailable. The judge referred to Dietrich v The Queen and accepted the decision confirmed the right to a fair trial and courts may grant an adjournment if a lack of representation may prejudice this right.

Citations

Bibliography 
Academic literature

Legal cases

News reports

Official reports

High Court of Australia cases
Australian criminal law
1992 in Australian law
1992 in case law
Rights in the Australian Constitution cases